Scrobipalpula manierreorum is a moth in the family Gelechiidae. It was described by Ronald J. Priest in 2014. It is found in North America, where it has been recorded from Alberta, British Columbia, Manitoba, Michigan, Ontario and Quebec.

The length of the forewings is 3.7−6.5 mm. There are white scales tipped with dark brown intermixed with brown, white and greyish-orange scales. There are two short dark brown streaks in the cell, as well as a broad, suffused greyish-orange streak from the base to the apex.

The larvae feed on Eurybia macrophylla. They mine the leaves of their host plant.

References

Scrobipalpula
Moths described in 2014